Warriorz is the fourth full-length studio album released by M.O.P., a hip hop duo composed of emcees Billy Danze and Lil' Fame. The album was released on October 10, 2000. Despite the growing popularity of M.O.P., this album marked their last major-label-affiliated release until Foundation in 2009, as Loud Records folded in 2002. Warriorz is M.O.P.'s most successful album by far. It debuted 65 places higher on the Billboard 200 charts than its previously highest-selling album, First Family 4 Life.

This album spawned the radio hit "Ante Up", which subsequently spawned a remix that also featured Busta Rhymes, Remy Ma, and M.O.P. associate Teflon. The popularity of the song was so widespread, it was featured in a few films within years of its release. "Ante Up" appeared in  the motion pictures War on Everyone, The Last Castle, Bodied, Brown Sugar, Dickie Roberts: Former Child Star, A Simple Favor, the dance film You Got Served, and 30 Minutes or Less. The song was also featured in an episode of the short lived television series Robbery Homicide Division, as well as an episode of Brooklyn Nine-Nine ("The Chopper") and an episode of The Mindy Project ("In the Club").

Track listing

Samples
Welcome to Brownsville
"So Deep in Love" by Deniece Williams
Everyday
"On the Radio" by Archie Bell & the Drells
Ante Up (Robbing-Hoodz Theory)
"Soul Sister Brown Sugar" by Sam & Dave
Face Off
"Just a Prisoner" and "It's Too Late" by Billy Paul
Warriorz
"I Forgot to Be Your Lover" by The Mad Lads
G-Building
"Don't Call Me Nigger, Whitey" by Sly & the Family Stone
On the Front Line
"And God Made Eve" by Pino Donaggio
Follow Instructions
"Blind Alley" by The Emotions
"Just Memories" by Eddie Kendricks
"Burning of the Midnight Lamp" by Jimi Hendrix
Calm Down
"Design for Living" by Nona Hendryx
Power
"Lover Man" by Grover Washington, Jr.
Background Niggaz
"That Kind of Fire" by Facts of Life
Cold as Ice
"Cold as Ice" by Foreigner
"Your Smiling Face" by James Taylor
Operation Lockdown
"Come Dance With Me" by One Way
Roll Call
"Peace of Mind" by S.O.U.L.

Personnel

Singles

Chart positions

Album

Singles

References

External links
 M.O.P. on MySpace

2000 albums
M.O.P. albums
Loud Records albums
Albums produced by DJ Premier
Albums produced by Nottz